Beheshtiabad (also Romanized as Beheshtīābād; also known as Beheshtābād) is a village in Gowhar Kuh Rural District, Nukabad District, Khash County, Sistan and Baluchestan Province, Iran. At the 2006 census, its population was 157, in 31 families.

References 

Populated places in Khash County